In Greek mythology, Aeolus or Aiolos was the son of Hellen, the ruler of Aeolia (later called Thessaly), and the eponym of the Aeolians, one of the four main tribes of the Greeks. According to the mythographer Apollodorus, Aeolus was the father of seven sons: Cretheus, Sisyphus, Athamas, Salmoneus, Deion, Magnes, Perieres, and five daughters: Canace, Alcyone, Pisidice, Calyce, and Perimede. He was said to have killed his daughter Canace (or forced her to kill herself) because she had committed incest with her brother Macareus. This Aeolus was sometimes confused with the Aeolus who was the ruler of the winds.

Family 
Aeolus was one of the central figures in the myths that were invented to explain the origins of the Greek people. He was the grandson of Deucalion the founder of the Deucalionids, one of the two most important families in Greek mythology (the other being the Inachids, the descendants of Inachus who originated in Argos).  Deucalion was the son of Prometheus, and the survivor of a great primordial flood, that covered much, if not all, of Greece (and the rest of the world, in late accounts). From Deucalion and his wife Pyrrha, sprang a new race of people, which repopulated Central Greece and the western Peloponnese. Deucalion and Pyrrha had a son Hellen, the eponym of the Hellenes, another name for the Greeks.

From Hellen came the eponyms of the four major tribes of the Greek people. According to the Hesiodic Catalogue of Women, Helen had three sons: Dorus, Xuthus, and Aeolus. Dorus was the eponym of the Dorians, and Xuthus's sons Achaeus and Ion were, respectively, the eponyms of the Acheaens and Ionians. However, it was from Hellen's third son Aeolus, the eponym of the Aeolians, that most if not all, of the heroes and heroines of the Deucalionids come.

The surviving Catalogue fragments do not contain the name of Aeolus' mother, but according to a scholion on Plato's Symposium citing Hellanicus (fl. late fifth century BC), her name was Othreis (Ὀθρηίς), while according to Apollodorus she was a nymph named Orseis (Ὀρσηίς). M. L. West says that both Othreis and Orseis are "probably" corruptions of Othyis (Ὀθρυίς), a nymph of Mount Othrys.

According to Apollodorus, Aeolus, married Enarete, the daughter of Deimachus, and together they had seven sons and five daughters. Apollodorus lists the sons as Cretheus, Sisyphus, Athamas, Salmoneus, Deion, Magnes, and Perieres, and the daughters as Canace, Alcyone, Pisidice, Calyce, and Perimede. The Hesiodic Catalogue also listed seven sons and five daughters, however only the names Cretheus, Athamas, Sisyphus, Salmoneus, Perieres, Pisidice, Alcyone, and Perimede are preserved. Apollodorus's "Deion", "Calyce" and "Canace" would fit well into the missing gaps in the papyrus that preserves this part of the Catalogue, however, his "Magnes" conficts with the Catalogues''' use of that name elsewhere.   Hellanicus apparently also had Aeolus as the father of Salmoneus by Iphis.

Other sources give other children by other mothers. The tragic playwright Euripides made Melanippe a daughter of Aeolus and Hippe (or Hippo), daughter of the Centaur Cheiron. According to the Roman mythographer Hyginus, the Macareus who had a tragic love affair with his sister Canace, was the son of "Aeolus son of Hellen". Xuthus, Aeolus' brother according to the Hesiodic Catalogue, and Apollodorus, was also said to be his son. Others who were sometimes said to have had Aeolus as a father include: Macedon, Minyas, Mimas, Cercaphus, Aethlius, Ceyx, Arne, Antiope, Tanagra, Iope and Tritogeneia.

Mythology
Apart from being the progenitor of many important descendants, Aeolus himself was of little mythological note. However he does play a role in one myth involving Hippe ('Mare'), the daughter of the Centaur Cheiron. Aeolus seduced Hippe, producing a daughter Melanippe, about whom the tragic playwright Euripides wrote two lost plays. The story, as it apparently appeared in Euripides' plays, is preserved in the astronomical literature of Eratosthenes and Hyginus. According to these sources, after becoming pregnant with Aeolus' child, Hippe fled into the mountains to escape the discovery of her pregnancy by her father Cheiron. When she was about to give birth and be discovered by her father, who had arrived in search of her, Hippe prayed to the gods to be made unrecognizable, and she was transformed into a horse and placed among the stars, becoming the constellation "the Horse" (modern Pegasus).

The Romans Ovid, and Hyginus, tell of the tragic love affair between Aeolus' son Macareus and his daughter Canace. According to Hyginus, after the incest Macareus killed himself, and Aeolus killed Canace. While, according to Ovid, Aeolus threw out Canace's new born baby as "prey to dogs and hungry birds", and gave Canace a sword and commanded her to kill herself with it.

This Aeolus was sometimes confused (or identified) with the Aeolus who is the keeper of the winds encountered by Odysseus in Homer's Odyssey.  The confusion perhaps first occurs in Euripides' lost tragedy Aeolus, where, although clearly based on the Odyssey's Aeolus, Euripides' Aeolus is, like Aeolus the son of Hellen, the father of a daughter Canace, and if the two are not identified, then they seem, at least, to be related. Although in the Odyssey, that Aeolus, was the son of Hippotes, Hyginus, describes the Aeolus encountered by Odysseus as "Aeolus, son of Hellen, to whom control of the winds had been given by Jove [the Roman equivalent of Zeus]". Ovid has Alcyone, as well as the tragic lovers Canace and Macareus, being children of an Aeolus who was the ruler of the winds, and calls Alcyone "Hippotades", ie. a descendant of Hippotes.

 Notes 

 References 
 Apollodorus, Apollodorus, The Library, with an English Translation by Sir James George Frazer, F.B.A., F.R.S. in 2 Volumes. Cambridge, Massachusetts, Harvard University Press; London, William Heinemann Ltd. 1921. . Online version at the Perseus Digital Library.
 Apollonius of Rhodes, Apollonius Rhodius: the Argonautica, translated by Robert Cooper Seaton, W. Heinemann, 1912. Internet Archive.
 Bell, Robert E., Women of Classical Mythology: A Biographical Dictionary. ABC-Clio. 1991. .
Clement of Alexandria, The Exhortation to the Greeks. The Rich Man's Salvation. To the Newly Baptized. Translated by G. W. Butterworth. Loeb Classical Library No. 92. Cambridge, Massachusetts: Harvard University Press, 1919. . Online version at Harvard University Press.  Internet Archive 1960 edition.
 Collard, Christopher and Martin Cropp, Euripides Fragments: Aegeus–Meleanger,  Loeb Classical Library No. 504, Cambridge, Massachusetts, Harvard University Press, 2008. . Online version at Harvard University Press.
 Cufalo, Domenico, Scholia Graeca in Platonem, I: Scholia ad Dialogos Tetralogiarumi - VII Continens, Roma, Edizioni di storia e letteratura, 2007. .
 Diodorus Siculus, Library of History, Volume III: Books 4.59-8, translated by C. H. Oldfather, Loeb Classical Library No. 340. Cambridge, Massachusetts, Harvard University Press, 1939. . Online version at Harvard University Press. Online version by Bill Thayer.
 Euripides, Ion, translated by Robert Potter in The Complete Greek Drama, edited by Whitney J. Oates and Eugene O'Neill, Jr. Volume 1. New York. Random House. 1938. Online version at the Perseus Digital Library.
 Evelyn-White, Huge G., The Homeric Hymns and Homerica with an English Translation by Hugh G. Evelyn-White, Cambridge, Massachusetts, Harvard University Press; London, William Heinemann Ltd. 1914. Google Books.
 Fowler, R. L. (2000), Early Greek Mythography: Volume 1: Text and Introduction, Oxford University Press, 2000. .
 Fowler, R. L. (2013), Early Greek Mythography: Volume 2: Commentary, Oxford University Press, 2013. .
 Gantz, Timothy, Early Greek Myth: A Guide to Literary and Artistic Sources, Johns Hopkins University Press, 1996, Two volumes:  (Vol. 1),  (Vol. 2).
 Grimal, Pierre, The Dictionary of Classical Mythology, Wiley-Blackwell, 1996. . Internet Archive.
 Hard, Robin (2004), The Routledge Handbook of Greek Mythology: Based on H.J. Rose's "Handbook of Greek Mythology", Psychology Press, 2004, . Google Books.
 Hard, Robin (2015), Eratosthenes and Hyginus: Constellation Myths, With Aratus's Phaenomena, Oxford University Press, 2015. .
 Homer, The Odyssey with an English Translation by A.T. Murray, PH.D. in two volumes. Cambridge, Massachusetts, Harvard University Press; London, William Heinemann, Ltd. 1919. Online version at the Perseus Digital Library.
 Hyginus, Gaius Julius, Fabulae, in The Myths of Hyginus, edited and translated by Mary A. Grant, Lawrence: University of Kansas Press, 1960. Online version at ToposText.
 Hesiod, Catalogue of Women in The Homeric Hymns and Homerica with an English Translation by Hugh G. Evelyn-White, Cambridge, Massachusetts, Harvard University Press; London, William Heinemann Ltd. 1914. Google Books.
 Kerényi, Karl, The Gods of the Greeks,  Thames and Hudson, London, 1951. Internet Archive.
 Homer, The Iliad with an English Translation by A.T. Murray, Ph.D. in two volumes. Cambridge, Massachusetts, Harvard University Press; London, William Heinemann, Ltd. 1924. Online version at the Perseus Digital Library.
 Most, G.W., Hesiod: The Shield, Catalogue of Women, Other Fragments, Loeb Classical Library, No. 503, Cambridge, Massachusetts, Harvard University Press, 2007. .
 Nauck, Johann August, Tragicorum graecorum fragmenta, Leipzig, Teubner, 1889. Internet Archive.
 Ovid, The Epistles of Ovid, translated into English prose, as near the original as the different idioms of the Latin and English languages will allow; with the Latin text and order of construction on the same page; and critical, historical, geographical, and classical notes in English, from the very best commentators both ancient and modern; beside a very great number of notes entirely new; London. J. Nunn, Great-Queen-Street; R. Priestly, 143, High-Holborn; R. Lea, Greek-Street, Soho; and J. Rodwell, New-Bond-Street, 1813. Online version at the Perseus Digital Library.
 Ovid, Metamorphoses, Brookes More, Boston, Cornhill Publishing Co. 1922. Online version at the Perseus Digital Library.
 Ovid, Tristia, Arthur Leslie Wheeler (ed.), Cambridge, Massachusetts, Harvard University Press, 1939. Online version at the Perseus Digital Library.
 Parada, Carlos, Genealogical Guide to Greek Mythology, Jonsered, Paul Åströms Förlag, 1993. .
 Pausanias, Description of Greece with an English Translation by W.H.S. Jones, Litt.D., and H.A. Ormerod, M.A., in 4 Volumes. Cambridge, Massachusetts, Harvard University Press; London, William Heinemann Ltd. 1918. Online version at the Perseus Digital Library.
 Plutarch, Moralia, Volume IV: Roman Questions. Greek Questions. Greek and Roman Parallel Stories. On the Fortune of the Romans. On the Fortune or the Virtue of Alexander. Were the Athenians More Famous in War or in Wisdom?, translated by Frank Cole Babbitt, Loeb Classical Library No. 305, Cambridge, Massachusetts, Harvard University Press, 1936. . Online version at Harvard University Press.
 Rose, H. J., s.v. Aeolus in the Oxford Classical Dictionary, second edition,  Hammond, N.G.L. and Howard Hayes Scullard (editors), Oxford University Press, 1992. .
 Smith, William, Dictionary of Greek and Roman Biography and Mythology, London (1873). Online version at the Perseus Digital Library.
 Stephanus of Byzantium, Stephani Byzantii Ethnicorum quae supersunt, edited by August Meineike (1790-1870), published 1849. A few entries from this important ancient handbook of place names have been translated by Brady Kiesling. Online version at the Topos Text Project.
 Strabo, Geography, translated by Horace Leonard Jones; Cambridge, Massachusetts: Harvard University Press; London: William Heinemann, Ltd. (1924). LacusCurtis, Online version at the Perseus Digital Library, Books 6–14.
 Tripp, Edward, Crowell's Handbook of Classical Mythology, Thomas Y. Crowell Co; First edition (June 1970). .
 West, M. L., The Hesiodic Catalogue of Women: Its Nature, Structure, and Origins'', Clarendon Press Oxford, 1985. .

Princes in Greek mythology
Mythological kings of Thessaly
Kings in Greek mythology
Deucalionids
Thessalian characters in Greek mythology
Thessalian mythology